Viktor Petrovich Sokol (born 5 December 1954) is a retired Soviet and Belarusian football player and a currently a manager. His son, who is also named Viktor Sokol is also a professional footballer.

Honours
 Soviet Top League winner: 1982.
 European Cup top scorer: 1983–84.

External links
 Profile

1954 births
Living people
Footballers from Minsk
Soviet footballers
Belarusian footballers
Belarusian expatriate footballers
Expatriate footballers in Poland
Soviet Top League players
FC Dynamo Brest players
FC Dinamo Minsk players
Jagiellonia Białystok players
FC Dinamo-93 Minsk players
Belarusian football managers
FC Dinamo-93 Minsk managers
FC Dynamo Brest managers
Association football forwards
UEFA Champions League top scorers